Scientific Leadership is an educational program in Israel which is sponsored by Rashi foundation and Beit Yaziv center. The program combines scientific study with the encouragement of social leadership and creating a solid foundation for studying science, physics and astronomy, as well as personal and social empowerment.

Background
High school students (10th-12th grades) with learning ability and high motivation, guides elementary school students on various scientific subjects combining experiential and social activity. The program exists in Beersheba, Ashdod, Kiryat Malakhi, Kiryat Gat, Arad, Dimona, Ofakim, Netivot, Merhavim, Eshel HaNasi, Segev Shalom and Yeruham. 
The activity is conducted with an emphasis on experiential learning and scientific experience. Games, experiments and models the students build on their own, are part of the experiential learning process we encourage. For example: by building and launching a hot air balloon we learn about weight, density and pressure.
Selected students, graduates of the 9th grade, will be summoned to a leadership training camp during the summer vacation. The training process continues in another camp combined with operating a science festival.
During the school year, the young leaders from all the communities where the program is running are convened once every few weeks to continue their training and learn from one another about what is happening in the various settlements. Those who are selected to guide additional year, undergo advanced training on leadership and science and are more responsible for the operation of current activities in the communities
.

After finishing high school, the leaders can choose one of the following possibilities: studies as a part of academic reserve program, service year along with military service, national service and pre-military preparation course.
Graduates who have committed military service / national service can get academic scholarships. Students in academy constitute a significant 
program. Thus, we see the closure of the circle and creating scientific leadership inside the community.

The Science Festival
As part of their training, all of the program's Youth participate and guide in a science festival which takes place in Beit Yaziv and Karaso Park of Science. In Various stations, young leaders give explanations about interesting scientific phenomena in physics, chemistry, biology, astronomy and more. Families come to the festival from all over the country and it lasts two days during the "Sukkot" holiday.

Octopus Monthly Magazine
Octopus the Scientific Leadership magazine is a monthly blog that deals with science and leadership. The blog is written by high school students participating in the program. The training goes through writing workshops and meetings with journalists from the line. To join the team, one should go interviews with senior magazine writers and write a series of articles.

"Shamaim"(Sky) team
This team provides guidance on astronomy to general public. Guiding includes operating various telescopes and planetarium, and vary according to the stars which appear in the sky that season.

External links
 Rashi Foundation website
 Beit Yaziv center website

Israel educational programs